William L. Lords House, also known as the Stone House, is a historic home located in Clear Lake Township, Steuben County, Indiana. It was built about 1866, and is a -story, "T"plan, dwelling constructed of random laid cut fieldstone. The house is representative of "folk architecture."

It was listed on the National Register of Historic Places in 2002.

References

Houses on the National Register of Historic Places in Indiana
Houses completed in 1866
Buildings and structures in Steuben County, Indiana
National Register of Historic Places in Steuben County, Indiana